Ubuntu Kylin is the official Chinese version of the Ubuntu computer operating system. It is intended for desktop and laptop computers, and has been described as a "loose continuation of the Chinese Kylin OS". In 2013, Canonical Ltd. reached an agreement with the Ministry of Industry and Information Technology to co-create and release an Ubuntu-based operating system with features targeted at the Chinese market.

The first official release, Ubuntu Kylin 13.04, was released on 25 April 2013, on the same day as Ubuntu 13.04 (Raring Ringtail). Features include Chinese input methods, Chinese calendars, a weather indicator, and online music search from the Dash.

History
Version 20.04 introduced version 3.0 of its own, newly developed UKUI (Ubuntu Kylin User Interface). Formerly, UKUI was a customization of the MATE desktop.

Version 14.10 introduced the Ubuntu Kylin Software Center (UKSC), and a utility which helps end-users for daily computing tasks called Youker Assistant.

The team cooperates with Sogou to develop Sogou Input Method for Linux. Since it is closed source, it is not included in the official Ubuntu Kylin image, but users can download it from UKSC or Sogou's website.

WPS Office, also closed-source, is the default office suite in the pro and enhanced editions. LibreOffice however is used mainly as default in the official vanilla Ubuntu Kylin image from the main Ubuntu server website without WPS Office installed.

Release history

See also
Canaima (operating system)
GendBuntu
BOSS Linux
Inspur
LiMux
Nova (operating system)
VIT, C.A.
Kingsoft WPS Office

References

External links

Ubuntu Kylin, wiki of the Ubuntu Kylin Team at wiki.ubuntu.com.

Chinese-language Linux distributions
Ubuntu derivatives
Linux distributions